The National Marine Electronics Association (NMEA) is a US-based marine electronics trade organization setting standards of communication between marine electronics.

Standards

NMEA 0183

NMEA 2000

NMEA OneNet
NMEA OneNet is a latest standard 
for maritime data networking based on 802.3 Ethernet, and will complement existing onboard NMEA 2000 networks by allowing for high-capacity data transfers.

Current maritime data networks have bandwidth capacities of less than 1Mbit/s. Building on Ethernet, OneNet allows for capacity in the hundreds or thousands of megabits per second. This extra bandwidth is needed for transferring unprocessed sensor data from sonar/radars, as well as video feeds from for example an engine room.

The primary features and goals of OneNet are as follows:
 NMEA 2000 data transfer over IPv6 in a standard format
 High-bandwidth applications such as radar, video and more that are not possible via NMEA 2000
 Support Ethernet and TCP/IP at 1 gigabit and faster speeds
 Utilize standardized connectors (RJ-45 and X-Coded M12) depending on installation
 Robust, industry-standard cybersecurity requirements
 NMEA 2000 gateway compatibility
 Mandatory device & application certification by the manufacturer, then verified by NMEA 

The use of the X-Coded M12 connector allows for up to 10 Gigabit Ethernet, but the full capabilities do not have to be utilized, and would also depend on the cabling that is installed.

See also
Radio Technical Commission for Maritime Services

References

Further reading

External links

Business organizations based in the United States
Maritime organizations